Wolfgang Rautenberg (27 February 1936 − 4 September 2011) was a German mathematician and logician whose areas of research were model theory, non-classical logic, modal logic, temporal logic and self reference.

Life
Rautenberg was born in Potsdam. He graduated with an abitur from the gymnasium in Ludwigslust. He studied mathematics and physics at the Humboldt University in East Berlin (GDR), and there in 1963 Rautenberg received a doctorate and worked as a logician. In 1968 Rautenberg graduated from the Humboldt University as an academic lecturer. From 1969 to 1973 Rautenberg was docent at the Humboldt University. Because the Stasi contacted him to force him into co-operation, Rautenberg left East Germany in 1973 and in 1974 became Professor in West Germany. In 1976 he accepted a call to chair the academic department for mathematical logic and foundations of mathematics at Freie Universität Berlin.

Wolfgang Rautenberg was also a very active contributor in the HP48 and HP49G / HP49G+ calculator community, with many important contributions.

Books
 .
 .
 .

References
 .
 .
 .

References

External links 
 Home page

1936 births
2011 deaths
German logicians
20th-century German mathematicians
21st-century German mathematicians
German philosophers
German male writers